The following lists events that happened during 1958 in the Union of Soviet Socialist Republics.

Incumbents
 First Secretary of the Communist Party of the Soviet Union – Nikita Khrushchev
 Chairman of the Presidium of the Supreme Soviet of the Soviet Union – Kliment Voroshilov
 Chairman of the Council of Ministers of the Soviet Union – Nikolai Bulganin (until 27 March), Nikita Khrushchev (starting 27 March)

Events
 1958 Soviet nuclear tests

March
 16 March – Soviet Union legislative election, 1958

May
 15 May – Sputnik 3 is launched.

August
 23–27 August – 1958 Grozny riots

September
 2 September – 1958 C-130 shootdown incident

Births
 2 January – Vladimir Ovchinnikov, pianist
 28 February – Natalya Estemirova, activist (died 2009)
 22 June – Serhiy Kot, Ukrainian historian (died 2022)

Full date missing
 Olga Tsepilova, sociologist

See also
 1958 in fine arts of the Soviet Union
 List of Soviet films of 1958

References

 
1950s in the Soviet Union
Years in the Soviet Union
Soviet Union
Soviet Union
Soviet Union